Murphy's Barn, also known as the Murphy Barn/Powers Studio is a historic building that was built in 1846, by Matthew M. Murphey in Carmel-by-the-Sea, California. The structure is recognized as an important American period farm building and the oldest remaining artist’s studio in Carmel. It was nominated by the Carmel City Council as a historical building and an application was submitted to the California Register of Historical Resources on July 1, 2002.

History

Murphy's homestead

The parcel of land was near Pescadero Canyon and the sand dunes within a grove of Eucalyptus trees.

Mathew's nephew, John Monroe Murphy (1831-1883) and his wife, Ann Curran (1831-1916), along with their eight children, ran a dairy from the area between 1867 to 1871. In 1872, the land surveyed by the U.S. Government General Land Office in San Francisco. In 1875, Murphy was allowed to formalize their family claim by paying the United States Government $1.25 per acre. On May 20, 1875, Murphy received a patent deed for his land signed by President Ulysses S. Grant. On July 24, 1878, Murphy and his wife recorded their homestead in the official records of Monterey County, on page 482 of the "Homesteads of Married Persons."

Murphy's Barn

Matthew Murphy built a rough-hewn pine log barn on the property in 1846. The barn still exists today as a residence. The barn/studio is behind the first basket-weave brick driveway and gate at the residence on north San Antonio Avenue.

The barn is a one-story timber-frame and Post-Adobe residence on a concrete foundation. Exterior walls hand-hewn logs and timber-frame that represented four periods of construction. The log barn, from the 1840-1850 period, timber-frame with horizontal planks from the 1904-1920 era, and two periods of Post-Adobe additions by Hugh W. Comstock, 1949, and 1996. The roof is wood shake. There are three adobe interior chimneys. A sunporch was added in 1949 and a remodel and addition added in 1996.

The building has been nominated by the Carmel City Council and submitted to the California Register of Historical Resources on July 1, 2002, by Kent L. Seavey. The property is significant under the California Register criterion 1 as the oldest remaining art studio in Carmel; and criterion 2 for its association with the John Martin family; Frank and Jane Powers; and Hugh Comstock for his Post-Adobe method of construction, which is one of the few Post-Adobe buildings remaining in Carmel.

Murphy's farmhouse
The farmhouse was originally part of the Murphy homestead that was constructed in 1946 by Matthew M. Murphy, called "The Dunes."

The farmhouse was a one-story wood-framed residence. Exterior walls have textured cement stucco over the original wood surface. It has a wood framed pergola running the length of the south-west side. The area below the pergola is covered with brick. The pitched side-gable roof is wood shake. There is a large exterior chimney. Several changes were made, including the exterior wood walls were stuccoed over in 1920, and a remodel in 1980.

John Murphy died on August 18, 1884, from a fall from a wagon, at age of 53. His wife, Ann stayed on the residence until 1901, when she leased  to E. B. Lindauer, a sand mining company of San Francisco. Ann moved to a house at 443 Watson street in Monterey. She died in 1916. she and her husband are buried in section 31 of the San Carlos Cemetery in Monterey.

The farmhouse has been nominated by the Carmel City Council and submitted to the California Register of Historical Resources on July 30, 2002, by Kent L. Seavey. The property is significant under the California Register criterion 1 in the area of History, as part of the oldest American period farmhouse remaining in Carmel; and criterion 2 for its association with the John Martin family, early famers in Carmel, and Frank and Jane Powers.

Powers buys barn and farmhouse

On March 16, 1904, attorney and real estate developer Frank Hubbard Powers purchased the site from Ann Murphy. The property included the farmhouse, barn, stables, and a wagon shed. Powers completed a restoration in 1907. The barn was used as the art studio for his artist-wife, Jane Gallatin Powers (1868-1944), who helped found the Carmel Arts and Crafts Club in 1905. His wife remodeled the one bedroom farmhouse putting in a wood floor and decorating it with her collection of Spanish antiques. Both Frank and Jane were major influences on the development of Carmel. The livingroom has a large window that looks out to the Carmel Bay across the sand dunes.

Several owners and remodeling’s took place over the years. In 1920, James and Maud MacKezsie bought the property from Frank Powers. They moved into the farmhouse and remodeled it from its original board-and-batten exterior with the present stuccoed exterior. The house was stoccoed to keep out the sand which filtered through the wall boards. An attached two-story guest house was added with a bedroom and office.

When James died, Maud had to sell the barn to Jesse and Catherine Colvin for $60,000 on April 23, 1937. The Colvin sisters subdivided the barn/studio and  oceanfront acres and sold it to William Crawford on May 15, 1947. On April 21, 1948, Carmel's Board of Adjustments gave Crawford permission to further subdivide the property. Crawford sold the barn/studio to Dr. Herbert S. Chapman and his wife on July 15, 1947 and kept the oceanfront property for himself. The farmhouse was sold to Virginia Jean Jones, who lived in the home for twenty years. When she died in 1974, left the house and lots to her friend Helen Heavey. When Helen Heavey died in 1974, the lots were passed on to her heir, Mildred Heavey Finley. When she died in 1978, the lots were willed to Robert Lee Finley, who sold them to Kristie Wilde and Paul Miller on April 12, 1993.

See also
 List of Historic Buildings in Carmel-by-the-Sea

References

External links

 She Had it All: Jane Gallatin Powers

1840s establishments in California
Carmel-by-the-Sea, California
Buildings and structures in Monterey County, California